The Targeted Export Assistance Program (TEA) is a program authorized by the Food Security Act of 1985 (P.L. 99-198) to assist U.S. producer groups in promoting exports of products adversely affected by foreign governments’ unfair trade practices. TEA is the predecessor of the Market Promotion Program (MPP), which was succeeded by the Market Access Program (MAP) in 1996.

References

External links
Market Access Program website
United States Department of Agriculture programs